Goa Gajah, or Elephant Cave, is located on the island of Bali near Ubud, in Indonesia. Built in the 9th century, it served as a sanctuary.

History
Although the exact origins of the cave are uncertain, it is believed to have been built as place for spiritual meditation. One folklore relates that it was created by the fingernail of the legendary giant Kebo Iwa. However, examining its style, the sanctuary was probably dated from the 11th century Bali Kingdom. The complex contains both Hindu and Buddhist imagery, as the cave contains lingam and yoni, symbol of Shiva, and the image of Ganesha, while by the river there are carved images of stupas and chattra, imagery of Buddhism.  

The cave was rediscovered by Dutch archaeologists in 1923, but the fountains and bathing pool were not discovered until 1954.

Site description
The temple is characterised by menacing faces that are carved into the stone – whose purpose is assumed to be the warding off of evil spirits. The primary figure was once thought to be an elephant, hence the nickname Elephant Cave. Other sources state that it is named after the stone statue of the Hindu God Ganesh (characterised by having the head of an elephant) located inside of the temple. The site is mentioned in the Javanese poem Desawarnana written in 1365. An extensive bathing place on the site was not excavated until the 1950s.  The entrance of the cave is accessed only by walking down a long flight of stairs. The inside of the temple is small and usually has trails of white smoke from the incense burning. Visitors wearing shorts will be issued a sarong to tie around the waist before entering the courtyard. The complex also contains 7 statues of women (out of which 1 has been destroyed due to an earthquake) holding water pitchers that depicts seven holy rivers of India: the Ganga River, Sarasvati River, Yamuna River, Godavari River, Sindhu River, Kaveri River, and Narmada River.

World Heritage Status
This site was added to the UNESCO World Heritage Tentative List on October 19, 1995, in the Cultural category, but was pulled out along with 11 other sites on 2015.

Notes

External links

References

 Elephant Cave - UNESCO World Heritage Centre Accessed 2009-03-06.
 
 

Tourist attractions in Bali
Archaeological sites in Indonesia
Buildings and structures in Bali
Cultural Properties of Indonesia in Bali